Money, Money, Money is a lost 1923 silent film drama directed by Tom Forman and starring Katherine MacDonald. It was produced by B. P. Schulberg under his production company Preferred Pictures and released through Associated First National, soon to be First National Pictures.

Cast
Katherine MacDonald as Priscilla Hobbs
Carl Stockdale as George C. Hobbs
Frances Raymond as Mrs. Hobbs
Paul Willis as Lennie Hubbs
Herschel Mayall as Mr. Carter
Brenda Fowler as Mrs. Carter
Margaret Loomis as Caroline Carter
Charles Clary as J. J. Grey
Jack Dougherty as Reggie Grey

References

External links
 

lobby poster

1923 films
American silent feature films
Lost American films
First National Pictures films
Films directed by Tom Forman
American black-and-white films
Silent American drama films
1923 drama films
Preferred Pictures films
1923 lost films
Lost drama films
1920s American films